Calymmanthera is a genus of flowering plants from the orchid family, Orchidaceae. It contains 5 species, native to Maluku, New Guinea, Fiji and the Solomon Islands.

Calymmanthera filiformis (J.J.Sm.) Schltr. - New Guinea
Calymmanthera major Schltr. - New Guinea, Fiji and the Solomon Islands
Calymmanthera montana Schltr. - - New Guinea
Calymmanthera paniculata (J.J.Sm.) Schltr. - New Guinea, Morotai
Calymmanthera tenuis Schltr. - New Guinea

See also 
 List of Orchidaceae genera

References

External links 

Vandeae genera
Aeridinae